Mayor of Hamilton may refer to:

Mayor of Hamilton, New Zealand
Mayor of Hamilton, Ontario